Heydt is a surname. Notable people with the surname include:
 Dorothy J. Heydt, American writer
 Francis Heydt (1918–2008), American swimmer
 Gerald T. Heydt, American electrical engineer
 Louis Jean Heydt (1903–1960), American actor
 Martin Heydt, American businessman

See also
 Von der Heydt